Kaatru Veliyidai is a 2017 Indian Tamil-language romantic war film, produced, written and directed by Mani Ratnam. Made under the Madras Talkies banner, it features music composed by A. R. Rahman, cinematography by Ravi Varman and editing by A. Sreekar Prasad. The film stars Karthi and Aditi Rao Hydari, with Lalitha, Rukmini Vijayakumar, Delhi Ganesh and RJ Balaji playing other pivotal roles. Set in the backdrop of the Kargil War of 1999, the film narrates the story of an Indian Air Force pilot who recalls his romance with a doctor in the lead up to the war, while being kept as a prisoner of war at a jail in Rawalpindi, Pakistan.

Principal photography of the film commenced in July 2016, with the shoot taking place in Ooty, Hyderabad, Ladakh, Chennai and Belgrade, before being completed in January 2017. The film was released worldwide on 7 April 2017 along with a Telugu dubbed version titled Cheliyaa . The film won two National Film Awards at the 65th National Film Awards: Best Music Direction for A. R. Rahman and Best Female Playback Singer for Shashaa Tirupati.

Plot
The film begins with a shot of the Kargil War showing the advances made by Indian soldiers. An Indian Air Force fighter jet is shot down by the enemy. The pilot Varun Chakrapani (VC) ejects from the hit aircraft and lands in enemy territory. The Pakistani Army promptly surrounds him. They imprison him in the Rawalpindi as a Prisoner of War (PoW) and subject him to torture. While being held captive, he reminisces about his romance with Leela.

Leela comes to Srinagar to work as a doctor. Meanwhile, Varun has an accident while on a joy ride. He is brought in a critical condition to the hospital. With the duty doctor not available, Leela takes charge, treats Varun, and nurses him back to health. But, with little regard to her feelings, he leaves the hospital without her knowledge.  Dr. Illyas Hussain, an army doctor, helps him with this.

When Leela learns about it, she and Nidhi, her colleague confront Illyas about it. Ilyas then arranges for Leela and Nidhi to come to an Airforce meeting the following week and there they meet Varun. Varun impresses her with his excellent dance moves at the Ball.  He tells her she should meet him at the Flying Club the next Saturday at 5 pm if she likes him back. Leela accepts and Varun takes her for a joy ride in his private aircraft to apologize for running away from the hospital.

Varun gets to know that Leela is his course pilot Ravi Abraham's sister, who died in a flight that Varun was supposed to fly in. Both develop feelings for each other. Later, Leela doesn't meet Varun for two months and questions Illyas about his whereabouts. He reveals that Varun has orders to be in a camp at Leh Military base for 3 months. Leela and Nidhi go to meet him. When Varun asks whether Leela came to meet him, she says yes. But also that she wanted to see the place where her brother Ravi died. He takes her to the spot. Slowly she realizes that Varun has a dark side to his personality, which is very different from what she has seen.

Back to the present, Varun and two other Indian prisoners plan to escape from the Rawalpindi prison. Back to the past, Leela leaves and he tells her that she'll get couriers from him. He's true to his word. One day, the officers are discussing their attack and she airs her opinion on the subject.  Varun angrily tells her that God made men and women for different purposes and she can't talk about this. But, she retaliates by saying that both genders are equal and women are not made just to manage the house and give birth to children. Varun tells Leela to shut up, but she refuses. So, he orders her to do what he tells her. She gets angry and moves out.

He goes to her home and tries to make up with her by expressing his love for her. He says he's not like her. Hers is a nobler job than him as he kills and she saves lives. So, Varun takes Leela to a local Registrar office and tells her that they should marry. As she is not ready for marriage, he asks her to think about it and come the next day at 4.00 pm. In a sad turn of events, he leaves for Delhi forgetting about what happened at the Registrar office. This upsets Leela very much. She feels that sometimes he treats her like a Queen whereas at other times like a doormat.

Leela reveals that she's pregnant. Varun gets hesitant about it and Leela says that she'll take care of her baby by herself. The following day, Leela's grandfather dies. VC goes to her house and finds that Leela's father hates him. That night he goes and tries to convince them, but he doesn't get even a single word from them. Before Varun departs for the Kargil war, Leela tells him that she's resigning and leaving Srinagar. He pleads for one more chance and goes away to war. While fighting, he gets captured by the enemy and taken a prisoner. Somehow, Varun and the two other prisoners escape and reach India.

Varun starts searching for Leela. He finds her after 3 years. He tells her that he's a different person now. He says that he regrets his meeting her and loving her only to end up hurting her. VC is surprised to learn that Leela has a daughter. When he sees her daughter, Leela asks him whether she (the small girl) looks like her father or mother. VC's happiness knows no bounds. He tells his daughter that he crossed 7 seas and 7 mountains to meet her. VC asks Leela why she didn't try to contact him, to which she says that she was afraid he wouldn't like her or their daughter. They hug each other and Leela says that Rohini (VC's daughter) is his responsibility from thereon.

Cast 

 Karthi as  Varun Chakrapani aka VC, an air force officer who is arrested by Pakistan army and later released
 Aditi Rao Hydari as Dr. Leela Abraham Varun's love interest (voice-over by Krithika Nelson)
 K. P. A. C. Lalitha as Achamma
 Rukmini Vijayakumar as Dr. Nidhi Leela's best friend 
 Shraddha Srinath as Girija Kapoor Varun's first girlfriend (cameo appearance) 
 RJ Balaji as Iliyas Hussain Leela's friend
 Delhi Ganesh as Col. Mithran Leela's grandfather 
 Sivakumar Ananth as Girish Reddy
 Vipin Sharma as lawyer Abraham Leela's father 
 Mir Sarwar as Muzaffar Khan
 Harish Raj as Madhusoodhanan Pillai, VC's brother
 Dhyana Madan as Rohini
 Supyarde Singh as VC's sister-in-Law
 Indranil Ghosh

Production

Development
After shelving a multi-cast project featuring Karthi and Dulquer Salmaan in the lead roles during December 2015, it was reported in the media that Mani Ratnam would instead work on a new film retaining Karthi as the lead actor and A. R. Rahman as the music composer and Ravi Varman as cinematographer. In February 2016, Karthi confirmed that he had signed on to play the lead role and would collaborate with the director twelve years after having worked with him as an assistant during the making of Aayutha Ezhuthu (2004). Mani Ratnam requested Karthi to lose weight through the CrossFit program and learn the basics of flying to portray the lead character of a pilot. He prepared for the role by understanding more about fighter pilots through a wing commander friend including Varthaman and analysed their typical fitness routine their body language. Karthi also was asked to sport a clean-shaven look like a part of his role and did so for the first time in his acting career. The start of the film was delayed as the team wanted to wait for a better climate, before beginning the shoot in Kashmir, while the team also chose to wait for Karthi to finish his commitments for the production of Kaashmora (2016). Sai Pallavi successfully auditioned for the leading female role of a doctor in the project and was signed on to make her debut as a lead actress in the Tamil film industry through the project. However, in April 2016, Mani Ratnam felt that the character had to be older and opted to leave Sai Pallavi out of the project, later replacing her with Aditi Rao Hydari. Hydari participated in Tamil lessons prior to the film's shoot, in order to improve her understanding of the script. She also worked in a hospital for a few days in order to get a better understanding of her role as a doctor.

Mani Ratnam and his team began location hunting in April 2016 to seek out replacements to resemble Kashmir and scouted areas including Himachal Pradesh, Kerala, Kodaikanal, Ooty and Coonoor. Meanwhile, Mani Ratnam also worked closely with music composer A. R. Rahman and lyricist Vairamuthu in finalizing seven songs for the film during the pre-production period. The rights to Faith Johnson's book Four Miles to Freedom was also bought by the team, as they looked to draw inspiration from the real-life incidents of Dilip Parulkar's escape from a Pakistani jail in 1971. Actors RJ Balaji and Delhi Ganesh joined the cast of the film in July 2016, while actress Shraddha Srinath revealed that she would feature in a small role as a brigadier's daughter. Kannada actor Harish Raj and Hindi actor Vipin Sharma also joined the first schedule of the film, making their debuts in the Tamil film industry. Likewise, actresses Lalitha and Rukmini Vijayakumar were signed up for roles during the film's initial schedule. The film's first look poster was revealed in early July 2016, with the title of Kaatru Veliyidai, inspired by a poem by Subramania Bharati, officially announced.

Filming
The shoot of the film began in early July 2016 in Nilgiris, Ooty with a twenty-day schedule featuring Karthi and Aditi Rao Hydari. The location was chosen to show Kashmir on screen, as the latter's climate had made conducting shooting there difficult. Art director Amaran and production designer Sharmishta Roy worked together on designing the set during the first schedule, choosing to enhance existing backgrounds rather than to create lavish sets. The team regularly shot scenes from sunrise onwards, in order to ensure that the film progressed quickly. A second schedule for the film took place in Hyderabad during October 2016, lasting a period of ten days. The team then moved to Leh and the surrounding areas of Ladakh for a third schedule lasting fifteen days, with action sequences choreographed by Sham Kaushal being filmed. In late November 2016, the team moved to shoot scenes in, Siberia and the surrounding snow-capped mountainous regions after they were denied permission to shoot action sequences involving aircraft in North India. During the ten-day schedule, the team also shot a romantic song in the snowy backdrop choreographed by Brindha. The shoot was concluded in mid-January 2017, with the team announcing that the post-production phase would take a couple of months.

Music

Release
The film had a theatrical release on 7 April 2017 in approximately 1500 screens worldwide. Kaatru Veliyidai was dubbed into Telugu as Cheliyaa which was also theatrically released simultaneously along with the original version. Sri Venkateswara Creations bought the Telugu dubbing rights for the film. While Sri Thenandal Films released the film throughout Tamil Nadu. Rights for Kerala was acquired by Sibu Thameens, while Arun Pandian acquired the rest of India rights under his company A&P Groups. The satellite rights of the film were sold to STAR Vijay.

Reception 
Upon release, Kaatru Veliyidai received mixed reviews; though critics predominantly praised the performance of Hydari along with Rahman's music and Ravi Varman's cinematography, they criticised Mani Ratnam's screenplay. Baradwaj Rangan of Film Companion gave the film a high score of 3.5 out of 5 stars, writing "as a movie, Kaatru Veliyidai leaves you wanting, but as cinema, very little can come close to it". Rangan added "like some of Mani Ratnam’s recent films, Kaatru Veliyidai feels abstracted" and that the "director is in his mature phase" with "a little less obvious, little more complicated version of storytelling". Anupama Subramaniam of the Deccan Chronicle wrote "Mani Ratnam, known for his romantic tales with a different note, surprises you with a fresh angle again", noting that it was "a poetic romance that is worth experiencing", while drawing particular praise for the performances of Karthi and Aditi Rao Hydari. A critic from DNA India noted that the film "does not disappoint" and that "to say that Mani portrays the lovers’ intense passion with a painter's bold and indelible strokes would be no exaggeration", while similarly Rediff.com's Divya Nair called the film a "beautiful romance". Malini Mannath of The New Indian Express wrote that "Kaatru Veliyidai is visual treat where roses overpower guns" and that despite a few glitches, it is a "love poem on celluloid". Kaveree Bamzai wrote for dailyo that "Few directors understand women as well as Mani Ratnam. He understands they are complicated, vulnerable, strong, powerful, independent and submissive at the same time. But it is in his writing of Varun that Mani Ratnam shows real spunk. Kaatru Veliyidai may not be Mani Ratnam's best, but it beats Bollywood." Tanul Thakur of thewire.in wrote in his analysis that "Kaatru Veliyidai's portrayal of toxic masculinity through the lens of a successful love story is much more intelligent and unsettling than it lets on."

Sify's reviewer also praised the film stating "it is an experience you must enjoy", stating "if you like beautiful, intimate, playful, passionate love story in typical Mani Ratnam style then Kaatru Veliyidai is bang on". Vishal Menon of The Hindu wrote "there are reasons why Kaatru Veliyidai is certainly no classic", "but when you leave the theatre with a lump in your throat, you remember how your love for this director doesn’t arise merely because he makes you smile — he does so much more than that". Giving the film their highest score of 2017, Top10Cinema.com wrote "it’s a custom made film for Maniratnam buffs, who are very well etched up with his trademark pattern of storytelling" and that "he film has brilliant flash point of visual and musical poetry with some nuance performances too". In their review, Behindwoods.com wrote the film "is a classical poetic love story" and that "it is not a film to watch but something to experience, but an experience that not everyone would accept".

In contrast, Karthik Kumar of The Hindustan Times called the film "an underwhelming love saga", adding "visually, Kaatru Veliyidai is beautiful, beyond anyone’s imagination" but the film "does not move you emotionally". Suganth of the Times of India noted "the leads have charm, and try their best to make us care, but we are never as emotionally invested in the fate of VC and Leela as we should be", though wrote "the film is saved to an extent by the technical proficiency on display — right from Ravi Varman’s lush visuals to Rahman’s peppy score and Sharmishta Roy’s realistic sets, the film is a treat technically". The Bangalore Mirror's critic wrote "Kaatru Veliyidai eventually is one of Mani Ratnam’s weaker films and that’s disappointing, thankfully it is not a disaster like Kadal". Likewise, a critic from The Indian Express wrote "Kaatru Veliyidai flunks the test" and "what we are left with is a few moments in which Hydari impresses, the spectacular scenery, shot by Ravi Varman, and a couple of rousing song-and-dance numbers, powered by A R Rahman’s score".

Box office
The film took a strong opening at the Tamil Nadu box office, grossing over ₹120 million during the first weekend and performed exceptionally well in Chennai, Coimbatore and Chengalpattu. However mixed reviews from social media and the release of three new Tamil films the following weekend led to the number of shows being screened to drop substantially in the second week of its theatrical run. The film performed well at the US box office, with the Tamil version earning $313,227. The film collected  in Tamil Nadu in three days.

Legacy
Songs from the film have inspired the titles of other Tamil films. A film titled Vaanil Thedi Nindren, inspired from the opening line of "Nallai Allai", began production in May 2017, before being cancelled. Likewise, a film titled Vaan starring Ashok Selvan began production in December 2018, with the name and first look poster drawing comparisons to the song "Vaan Varuvaan" from Kaatru Veliyidai.

Accolades

Notes

References

External links 
 

2017 films
Indian aviation films
Films about aviators
Films shot in Ooty
Films directed by Mani Ratnam
Films scored by A. R. Rahman
Films shot in Ladakh
Films shot in Hyderabad, India
War romance films
Indian Air Force in films
Films shot in Serbia
Films set in Punjab, Pakistan
Indian war drama films
Kargil War
Films set in prison
Prisoner of war films
Indian nonlinear narrative films
Indian Army in films
Films based on Indo-Pakistani wars and conflicts
War films based on actual events
Drama films based on actual events
2017 war drama films
Films set in Jammu and Kashmir
Kashmir conflict in films
Military of Pakistan in films
Films set in Kargil
2017 drama films